Ashford Carbonell is a civil parish in Shropshire, England.  It contains 32 listed buildings that are recorded in the National Heritage List for England.  Of these, two are listed at Grade II*, the middle grade of the three grades, and the others are at Grade II, the lowest grade.  The parish contains the village of Ashford Carbonell and the surrounding countryside.  Most of the listed buildings are in the village, and include houses with associated structures, cottages, a church and items in the churchyard, a school, and a war memorial.  Outside the village they include a bridge, a farmhouse and farm buildings, a former public house and a former malt house, both converted into private houses, an outbuilding, a watermill and a weir, and a house.


Key

Buildings

References

Citations

Sources

Lists of buildings and structures in Shropshire